Johanna Wilhelmina Cilliers (born 1950), known professionally as Jana Cilliers, is a South African bilingual actress. She is the recipient of a number of accolades, including two South African Film and Television Awards and a Fleur du Cap Theatre Award.

Early life

A native of Pretoria, Cilliers is the daughter of the abstract painter Bettie Cilliers-Barnard and Carel Hancke Cilliers. She attended Hoërskool Menlopark. She pursued a Bachelor of Arts at the University of Pretoria before going on to train at the Royal Academy of Dramatic Art (RADA) in London, completing her acting diploma in 1973.

Personal life

Cilliers was married to film director and scriptwriter Regardt van den Bergh in the 1980s, with whom she had two daughters: Lika Berning and Leán. After Cilliers' and van den Bergh's divorce, Cilliers married Bill Flynn, who died in 2007.

Filmography

Filmmaking credits

 Bettie (2015) – documentary

Film

Television

Awards and nominations

References

External links
 
 Jana Cilliers at TVSA

Living people
1950 births
20th-century South African actresses
21st-century South African actresses
Alumni of RADA
People from Pretoria
South African film actresses
South African television actresses
University of Pretoria alumni